Leptodactylus myersi is a species of frog in the family Leptodactylidae. It is also known as Myers' ditch frog.

It is found in Brazil, French Guiana, Suriname, and possibly Guyana. Its natural habitats are subtropical or tropical moist lowland forests, intermittent rivers, and rocky areas. It is not considered threatened by the IUCN.

References

myersi
Taxonomy articles created by Polbot
Amphibians described in 1995